Trzebień  is a village in the administrative district of Gmina Bolesławiec, within Bolesławiec County, Lower Silesian Voivodeship, in south-western Poland.

The village has a population of 770.

During World War II the Germans established and operated a subcamp of the Gross-Rosen concentration camp in the village, whose prisoners were about 1,700-1,800 Jews, many of whom died. Around 1,000 prisoners were evacuated in February 1945 to camps in Görlitz, Zittau and the Gross-Rosen and Buchenwald concentration camps, while 300 severely ill prisoners were left in the camp, where they were liberated by Soviet troops.

Notable residents
Helmut Bruck (1913–2001), Luftwaffe officer

References

Villages in Bolesławiec County